Pomroy Monroe "Roy" Neighbors (July 11, 1923 – December 19, 2017) was an American politician who was a Democratic member of the Nevada General Assembly. He was a mining consultant. Neighbors was a veteran of the United States Navy and served in World War II and the Korean War. He is also a retired naval aviator in the United States Naval Reserve. His previous political experience included manager of Nye County, Nevada for 15 years.

References

1923 births
2017 deaths
Democratic Party members of the Nevada Assembly
People from Chelan County, Washington
People from Tonopah, Nevada
United States Navy personnel of World War II
United States Navy personnel of the Korean War